John Grover may refer to:

John William Grover (1836–1892), civil engineer
John Grover (British Army officer) (1897 – 1979), British general
John Grover (cricketer) (1915–1990), English cricketer
John Fredrick Orrin Grover (1923-1994) Flying Tiger Pilot mentioned in Flying Aces book